An infrared excess is a measurement of an astronomical source, typically a star, that in their spectral energy distribution has a greater measured infrared flux than expected by assuming the star is a blackbody radiator.  Infrared excesses are often the result of circumstellar dust heated by starlight and reemitted at longer wavelengths. They are common in young stellar objects and evolved stars on the asymptotic giant branch or older. 

In addition, monitoring for infrared excess emission from stellar systems is one possible method that could enable a search for large-scale stellar engineering projects of a hypothetical extraterrestrial civilization; for example a Dyson sphere or Dyson swarm. This infrared excess would be the outcome of the waste heat emitted by the aforementioned structures if they are considered blackbodies at temperatures close to 300 K.

References

Observational astronomy